Gunnar Teodor Kullendorf (born 26 March 1914; died 3 October 1993) was a Swedish curler.

Teams

References

External links
 
 (look at "KULLENDORFF, GUNNAR T")
Gunnar Kullendorff 1914 - 1993 BillionGraves Record
Gunnar Teodor Kullendorff (1914 - 1993) - Genealogy
Gunnar Kullendorff - Gravar.se
Personakt för Läkare Gunnar Teodor Kullendorff, Född 1914-03-26 Karlskrona Stadsförsamling, Blekinge Län, Sverige

1914 births
1993 deaths
People from Karlskrona
Swedish male curlers
Swedish curling champions
20th-century Swedish people